The Netherlands is scheduled to compete at the 2024 Summer Olympics in Paris from 26 July to 11 August 2024. Dutch athletes have appeared in every edition of the Summer Olympic Games except for two occasions: the sparsely attended 1904 Summer Olympics in St. Louis and the 1956 Summer Olympics in Melbourne as a protest against the Soviet invasion of Hungary.

Competitors
The following is the list of number of competitors in the Games. Note that reserves in field hockey, football, and handball are not counted:

Athletics

Dutch track and field athletes achieved the entry standards for Paris 2024, either by passing the direct qualifying mark (or time for track and road races) or by world ranking, in the following events (a maximum of 3 athletes each):

Track and road events

Equestrian

The Netherlands entered a full squad of equestrian riders each to the team dressage and jumping competitions through the 2022 FEI World Championships in Herning, Denmark.

Dressage

Qualification Legend: Q = Qualified for the final based on position in group; q = Qualified for the final based on overall position

Jumping

References

Nations at the 2024 Summer Olympics
2024
2024 in Dutch sport